Morecambe Bay is a large estuary in northwest England, just to the south of the Lake District National Park. At its peak, 15% of Britain's gas supply came from the bay but production is now in decline. It is also one of the homes of the high brown fritillary butterfly.

Natural features

The rivers Leven, Kent, Keer, Lune and Wyre drain into the Bay, with their various estuaries making a number of peninsulas within the bay. Much of the land around the bay is reclaimed, forming salt marshes used in agriculture. Morecambe Bay is also an important wildlife site, with abundant birdlife and varied marine habitats, and there is a bird observatory at Walney Island. The bay has rich cockle beds, which have been fished by locals for generations.

There are seven main islands in the bay, all to the west; Walney, Barrow, Sheep, Piel, Chapel, Foulney and Roa. Walney is substantially larger than the others, with its southern tip marking the north-western corner of the Bay. Sheep, Piel, Chapel and Foulney Islands are tidal and can be walked to at low tide with appropriate care. Local guidance should be sought if walking to Chapel or Piel islands as fast tides and quicksand can be extremely dangerous. Roa Island is linked to the mainland by a causeway, while Barrow Island has been connected to the mainland as part of the docks system at Barrow-in-Furness.

History

The extensive sandflats are the remains of a vast sandur or outwash plain established by meltwaters as the last ice age waned. Sea-level was still some 3m below present day levels at the start of the Holocene some 11,000 years ago.

The Greek geographer and astronomer Claudius Ptolemy (died c170 AD) referred in his writings to Morikambe eischusis as a location on Britain's west coast, lying between the Ribble and the Solway. The sixteenth-century scholar William Camden identified the locality as being near Silloth, hence the similar name of that bay but the eighteenth century antiquarian John Horsley who translated Ptolemy into English in 1732 favoured it being the bay on the then Lancashire/Cumberland border. In 1771 historian John Whitaker took up this latter suggestion and the name appeared on maps subsequently. The first recorded to do so being one associated with Father Thomas West's Antiquities of Furness of 1774. Camden believed the name originated with two words meaning crooked sea whilst West offered up white/beautiful haven though current thought is that it refers to a curve of the sea.

There have been royally appointed local guides (holding the post of King's Guide to the Sands) for crossing the bay for centuries. This difficulty of crossing the bay added to the isolation of the land to its north which, due to the presence of the mountains of the Lake District, could only be reached by crossing these sands or by ferry, until the Furness Railway was built in 1857. This skirts the edge of the bay, crossing the various estuaries.  The London-Glasgow railway also briefly runs alongside the bay - the only place where the West Coast Main Line actually runs alongside the coast.

The bay is notorious for its quicksand and fast moving tides. On the night of 5 February 2004, at least 21 Chinese illegal immigrant cockle pickers drowned after being cut off by the tides.

Morecambe Bay is also home to several of the UK's offshore wind farms: West of Duddon Sands, Burbo Bank, Walney, Barrow, and Ormonde.

Population

Around 320,000 people live along the coastline of Morecambe Bay, with the largest town being Barrow-in-Furness to the west. Morecambe was once a popular seaside holiday destination, whilst Barrow still relies on the seas for a large percentage of its economy in ship and submarine construction.

Natural gas

The bay has Britain's second-largest natural gas field, in the Triassic Sherwood Sandstone with a seal of Mercia Mudstone and a Carboniferous source. Both are operated by Centrica Energy. The combined gas reserves on discovery were estimated at 179 billion cubic metres (6.45 trillion cubic feet (tcf)). A further 0.65tcf is recognised in the satellite fields of Bains, Calder (Rivers), Dalton, Millom East and Millom West, and a number of smaller fields have been identified.

The gas is landed at three terminals at Westfield Point in Barrow-in-Furness, collectively referred to as the Rampside Gas Terminal. The South Morecambe Central Processing Complex is connected via a 36-inch pipeline to the South Morecambe terminal. North Morecambe gas has a different composition so the unmanned Drilling and Production Platform is linked by a separate 36" wet sealine to the North Morecambe Terminal, where it is stripped of water, CO2 and nitrogen. The Rivers Terminal has a dedicated pipeline for sour gas from the Calder field, which must be stripped of hydrogen sulphide before processing by the North Morecambe Terminal. The hydrogen sulphide is converted to sulphuric acid which is sold for industrial use. In 1991 a 229 MW CCGT power plant was opened near the terminals, on the site of the former coal-fired Roosecote Power Station. There is a support base at Heysham Port and personnel are typically moved by helicopter from Blackpool International Airport. Five rig workers and the two pilots of a Eurocopter AS365 Dauphin were lost when it crashed in sight of the platform on 27 December 2006.

At peak production 15% of UK supply came from the two main fields. As of 2006 Centrica reckoned there was about 1.2tcf of economic gas remaining in them, and they planned to operate the fields for another 10–15 years. In June 2011 they announced the South Morecambe field would be suspended as a result of tax increases in the 2011 Budget which meant South Morecambe would be paying a rate of 81% tax; North Morecambe and Rivers would continue in production as they are taxed at 62%. Production resumed from the South Morecambe field in July 2011.

Bridge and tidal barrage proposal
In 2004, a proposal was made to build a bridge across the bay flanked by wind turbines and using tidal power. Proposals from Northern Tidal Power Gateways in 2019 outlined a tidal barrage with a road running along on top.

Cultural reference

The poetical illustration, Lancaster, by Letitia Elizabeth Landon relates a tragic incident on the dangerous sands in the neighbourhood, which must be those of Morecambe Bay.

Further reading
A brief article on the Morecambe Bay tidal crossing appeared in 2005: Cawley, David [2005]: Time & Tide: Morecambe Bay, hidden europe magazine, 4 (Sept 2005), pp. 40–44.
A book about the bay, The Gathering Tide: A Journey Around the Edgelands of Morecambe Bay (Saraband, 2016) by environmentalist Karen Lloyd, is a  memoir of a year spent walking the coast, involving social history, archaeology and local wildlife.

References

External links

Morecambe Bay partnership - local conservation charity
Walney bird observatory
ITV footage of Morecambe Bay Half Marathon 2008
 The Cross Bay Challenge on Morecambe Bay by Keith Wilkinson (reporter)
Morecambe Bay ARS - Local Amateur Radio Society and Training
Sands Amateur Radio Contest Group -Amateur Radio Group in Morecambe
Walks in the Morecambe Bay area
Morecambe Bay Visitor Information site - Lancaster City Council Tourism website
Morecambe Bay Local Information Site

 
Landforms of Lancashire
Ramsar sites in England
Special Protection Areas in England
Bays of England
Bays of the Irish Sea
Sites of Special Scientific Interest in Cumbria
Sites of Special Scientific Interest in Lancashire
City of Lancaster
Special Areas of Conservation in England
Salt marshes of the United Kingdom
Landforms of Cumbria
Furness
Barrow-in-Furness
Natural regions of England